The year 1938 in science and technology involved some significant events, listed below.

Astronomy
June 28 – A 450-ton meteorite strikes the Earth in an empty field near Chicora, Pennsylvania, United States.

Biology
 December 22 – Marjorie Courtenay-Latimer discovers a Coelacanth, formerly seen only in fossils millions of years old, in a fisherman's catch in South Africa.
 Last known (captive) specimen of Schomburgk's deer is killed.
 Bawden and Pirie publish the first crystal of a spherical virus, Tomato bushy stunt virus.

Chemistry
 April 6 – Roy J. Plunkett of DuPont accidentally discovers polytetrafluoroethylene (Teflon).
 September 20 – The first patents for nylon (first synthesized in 1935) are granted in the name of Wallace Carothers to DuPont. The first items produced in the new material are toothbrush bristles.
 November 16 – Lysergic acid diethylamide is first synthesized by Albert Hofmann from ergotamine at the Sandoz Laboratories in Basel.
 Melamine thermosetting resin is developed by American Cyanamid.

Computer science
 Konrad Zuse in Berlin completes his Z1 computer, a floating point binary mechanical calculator with limited programmability, using Boolean logic and reading instructions from perforated 35 mm film.

History of science
 Albert Einstein and Leopold Infeld publish The Evolution of Physics.

Mathematics
 Frank Benford restates the law of distribution of first digits.
 Alan Turing completes his Ph.D. thesis, Systems of Logic Based on Ordinals, at Princeton University; it is presented to the London Mathematical Society on June 16.

Medicine
 June 4–6 – Sigmund Freud and his immediate family leave Vienna for exile in London.
 March 4 – American biogerontologist Raymond Pearl demonstrates the negative health effects of tobacco smoking.
 October – Robert Edward Gross becomes the first surgeon successfully to ligate an uninfected patent ductus arteriosus, in Boston.
 Dorothy Hansine Andersen describes the characteristic cystic fibrosis of the pancreas and correlates it with the celiac, respiratory and intestinal diseases prominent in the condition, also first hypothesizing that cystic fibrosis is a recessive disorder.
 Hans Asperger first adopts the term autism in its modern sense in referring to autistic psychopaths in a lecture (in German) on child psychology.
 Ugo Cerletti and Lucio Bini discover electroconvulsive therapy.
 American endocrinologist Henry Turner describes Turner syndrome.

Physics
 December 17 – Discovery of nuclear fission by Otto Hahn, Lise Meitner and Fritz Strassmann with Otto Robert Frisch.
 Herbert E. Ives and G. R. Stilwell execute the Ives–Stilwell experiment, showing that ions radiate at frequencies affected by their motion.
 Nuclear magnetic resonance is first described and measured in molecular beams by Isidor Rabi.
 The Vlasov equation is first proposed for description of plasma by Anatoly Vlasov.

Technology
 László Bíró obtains his first patent for a ballpoint pen, in France.

Publications
 Ștefan Odobleja begins publication of his Psychologie consonantiste in Paris, seen in Romania as originating the study of cybernetics.

Awards
 Nobel Prizes
 Physics – Enrico Fermi
 Chemistry – Richard Kuhn
 Medicine – Corneille Jean François Heymans
 Copley Medal: Niels Bohr
 Wollaston Medal for geology: Maurice Lugeon

Births
 January 2
 Lynn Conway, American computer engineer
 Farouk El-Baz, Egyptian-American space scientist
 Dana Ulery, American computer scientist
 January 10 – Donald Knuth, American computer scientist and mathematician
 January 28 – Tomas Lindahl, Swedish biochemist, recipient of the Nobel Prize in Chemistry
 March 5 – Lynn Margulis, American biologist (d. 2011)
 March 7 – David Baltimore, American biologist, university administrator and recipient of the Nobel Prize in Physiology or Medicine
 March 31 – Dennis H. Klatt, American pioneer of speech synthesis (d. 1988)
 April 3 – John Darley, American social psychologist
 April 25 – Roger Boisjoly, American rocket engineer (d. 2012)
 May 11 – Fritz-Albert Popp, German biophysicist
 May 16 – Ivan Sutherland, American computer scientist and Turing Award winner
 June 29 – David Barker, English epidemiologist (d. 2013)
 July 2 – C. Kumar N. Patel, Indian electrical engineer
 July 11 – Anthony Sebastian, American physician-scientist, recipient of the Belding H. Scribner Award 2002
 July 19 – Jayant Narlikar, Indian astrophysicist
 September 3 – Ryōji Noyori, Japanese chemist, Nobel laureate
 September 26 – Alan Andrew Watson, Scottish astrophysicist
 September 30 – Alfred Cuschieri, Malta-born laparoscopic surgeon
 October 4 – Kurt Wüthrich, Swiss chemist, Nobel Prize laureate
 October 22 – Michael Berridge, Rhodesian-born British physiologist and biochemist (d. 2020)
 November 7 – Edgardo Gomez, Filipino biologist (d. 2019)
 December 7 – George Hockham, English electrical engineer (d. 2013)
 December 23 – Bob Kahn, American Internet pioneer

Deaths
 January 31 – Sir James Crichton-Browne, Scottish psychiatrist (b. 1840)
 May 3 – Percy Furnivall, English surgeon (b. 1868)
 May 16
 Fred Baker, American physician and naturalist (b. 1854)
 Joseph Strauss, American bridge engineer (b. 1870)
 June 13 – Beverly Thomas Galloway, American plant pathologist (b. 1863)
 November 20 – Edwin Hall, American physicist, discoverer of the "Hall effect" (b. 1855)

References

 
20th century in science
1930s in science